Barsaat may refer to:

Barsaat (1949 film), a Bollywood film
Barsaat (1995 film), a Bollywood film
Barsaat (2005 film), a Bollywood film

See also
Baarish (disambiguation)
 Barsaat Ki Raat, 1960 film by P. L. Santoshi
 Barsaat Ki Ek Raat, 1981 Indian film by Shakti Samanta